Prenti Downs Station is a pastoral lease and cattle station located in the Mid West region of Western Australia.

Neighbouring properties include Carnegie and Windidda Stations.

The area is composed of a mixture of landscapes including saltbush dominated  clay pans, mulga country and grasslands. The stock can be watered at 34 different water points as well as numerous claypans and fresh water creeks. In 2013 Prenti Downs was carrying a herd of 4,000 shorthorn cattle.

New Management 
After purchasing the property a new style of management of livestock was introduced, self mustering yards, in an effort to manage large feral herbivores and wild cattle. This reduces animal stress, and non-productive grazers.

Technology Driven 
Since registering a Human-induced regeneration carbon sequestration project Prenti Downs have started to deploy a remote monitoring system across the property to better manage the total grazing pressure in an effort to promote the restoration of native forest cover.

See also
List of ranches and stations
List of pastoral leases in Western Australia

References

Homesteads in Western Australia
Pastoral leases in Western Australia
Mid West (Western Australia)
Stations (Australian agriculture)